Inka Q'asa (Quechua inka Inca q'asa mountain pass, "Inca pass", also spelled Inca Khasa) is a mountain in the Bolivian Andes which reaches a height of approximately . It is located in the Cochabamba Department, Ayopaya Province, Morochata Municipality. The Ch'uya Mayu ("crystal-clear river") originates west of the mountain. It flows to the west as a left tributary of the Río Negro (Spanish for "black river").

References 

Mountains of Cochabamba Department